Markus Toivonen (born 1979 in Helsinki) is the founding member of the Finnish folk/death metal band Ensiferum. Markus founded the band in 1995 and is the sole original member to have lasted the distance to Ensiferum's present incarnation. His role in the band is guitarist and primary songwriter. He has always contributed backing vocals and since the departure of Jari Mäenpää in 2004 has taken up a greater role behind the microphone, sharing the clean vocal parts with new bass player Sami Hinkka, with Mäenpää's replacement Petri Lindroos handling the harsh vocals.

Markus also plays in a side band called Speden Timantit and has been a member of the short-lived black/death metal outfit Soulstream.

External links 
Official Ensiferum website

1979 births
Living people
Musicians from Helsinki
Finnish heavy metal musicians
Finnish male musicians
Ensiferum members